Old Central High School may refer to:

Old Central High School (Pittsfield, Massachusetts), listed on the National Register of Historic Places in Berkshire County, Massachusetts
Old Central High School (Kalamazoo, Michigan), listed on the National Register of Historic Places in Kalamazoo County, Michigan